The 1965 Australian Drivers' Championship was a CAMS sanctioned Australian national motor racing title open to racing cars complying with the Australian National Formula or the Australian 1½ Litre Formula. The title was contested over a six race series with the winner awarded the 1965 CAMS Gold Star. It was the ninth Australian Drivers' Championship.

The championship was won by Victorian racer Bib Stillwell driving a Repco Brabham BT11A-Coventry Climax. Stillwell won by 19 points from Jack Brabham (Repco Brabham BT11A-Coventry Climax). Three drivers shared third place, Spencer Martin (Repco Brabham BT11A-Coventry Climax), Leo Geoghegan (Lotus 32-Ford) and John McDonald (Cooper T53-Coventry Climax and Cooper T70-Coventry Climax).

Stillwell won three of the six races with the remaining race wins attained by Jim Clark (Lotus 32B-Coventry Climax), Bruce McLaren (Cooper T79-Coventry Climax) and Martin.

Calendar

The championship was contested over a six race series.

The International 100 and the Australian Grand Prix were also rounds of the 1965 Tasman Series.

Points system
Championship points were awarded on a 9-6-4-3-2-1 basis to the first six placegetters, however only holders of a current and valid full General Competition Licence issued by CAMS were eligible. The title was awarded to the driver gaining the highest points total in the Australian Grand Prix and any four of the other races.

Results

 Jim Clark won the International 100 at Warwick Farm but Jack Brabham was awarded maximum points as the highest placed CAMS license holder.
 Bruce McLaren won the Australian Grand Prix at Longford but Jack Brabham was awarded maximum points as the highest placed CAMS license holder.

References

External links
 Early CAMS Gold Star Series – 1965 Gold Star Gallery

Australian Drivers' Championship
Drivers' Championship